In probability theory, a log-t distribution or log-Student t distribution is a probability distribution of a random variable whose logarithm is distributed in accordance with a Student's t-distribution. If X is a random variable with a Student's t-distribution, then Y = exp(X) has a log-t distribution; likewise, if Y has a log-t distribution, then X = log(Y) has a Student's t-distribution.

Characterization
The log-t distribution has the probability density function:
,

If  and  then the underlying distribution is the standardized Student's t-distribution.

If  then the distribution is a log-Cauchy distribution.  As  approaches infinity, the distribution approaches a log-normal distribution.  Although the log-normal distribution has finite moments, for any finite degrees of freedom, the mean and variance and all higher moments of the log-t distribution are infinite or do not exist.

The log-t distribution is a special case of the generalized beta distribution of the second kind.  The log-t distribution is an example of a compound probability distribution between the lognormal distribution and inverse gamma distribution whereby the variance parameter of the lognormal distribution is a random variable distributed according to an inverse gamma distribution.

Applications
The log-t distribution has applications in finance.  For example, the distribution of stock market returns often shows fatter tails than a normal distribution, and thus tends to fit a Student's t-distribution better than a normal distribution.  While the Black-Scholes model based on the log-normal distribution is often used to price stock options, option pricing formulas based on the log-t distribution can be a preferable alternative if the returns have fat tails.  The fact that the log-t distribution has infinite mean is a problem when using it to value options, but there are techniques to overcome that limitation, such as by truncating the probability density function at some arbitrary large value.

The log-t distribution also has applications in hydrology and in analyzing data on cancer remission.

Multivariate log-t distribution
Analogous to the log-normal distribution, multivariate forms of the log-t distribution exist.  In this case, the location parameter is replaced by a vector μ, the scale parameter is replaced by a matrix Σ.

References

Continuous distributions
Probability distributions with non-finite variance